Ambur railway station is located in Ambur, Tirupattur district, Tamil Nadu This station was declared as model station and classified as Class-B category on the basis of daily earning which is around one lakh.

Facilities
This station has a waiting hall, dormitory, retiring rooms, AC and non-AC upper class waiting room and separate waiting rooms for men & women.

Expansion
Ambur railway station new building foundation was laid in the year 2008 by then Minister of State for Railways R. Velu. In the year 2010, the new railway station building along with extensions of platform 2 & 3 and also with other amenities such as waiting rooms, retiring rooms and dormitory was inaugurated.

References

Railway stations in Vellore district
Chennai railway division